Caledonia was the Latin name used by the Roman Empire to refer to the part of Great Britain that lies north of the River Forth,  which includes most of the land area of Scotland. Today, it is used as a romantic or poetic name for all of Scotland. During the Roman Empire's occupation of Scotland, the area they called Caledonia was physically separated from the rest of the island by the Antonine Wall. The Romans several times invaded and occupied it, but unlike the rest of the island, it remained outside the administration of Roman Britain.

Latin historians, including Tacitus and Cassius Dio, referred to the territory north of the River Forth as "Caledonia", and described it as inhabited by the Maeatae and the Caledonians. Other ancient authors, however, used the adjective "Caledonian" more generally to describe anything pertaining to inland or northern Britain. The name is probably derived from a word in  one of the Gallo-Brittonic languages.

History

Etymology 
According to Zimmer (2006), Caledonia is derived from the tribal name Caledones (or Calīdones), which he etymologises as possessing hard feet', alluding to standfastness or endurance", from the Proto-Celtic roots *kal- "hard" and *φēdo- "foot". Similarly, journalist Alistair Moffat suggests the name is related to the Welsh word caled, "hard", which could refer to the rocky land or the hardiness of the people.

Toponymy 
The name of the Caledonians may be found in toponymy, such as Dùn Chailleann, the Scottish Gaelic word for the town of Dunkeld meaning "fort of the Caledonii", and possibly in that of the mountain Sìdh Chailleann, the "fairy hill of the Caledonians". According to Historia Brittonum the site of the seventh battle of the mythical Arthur was a forest in what is now Scotland, called Coit Celidon in early Welsh. The name may be related to that of a large central Brythonic tribe, the Caledonii, one amongst several in the area and perhaps the dominant tribe, which would explain the binomial Caledonia/Caledonii.

Modern usage 

The modern use of "Caledonia" in English and Scots is either as a historical description of northern Britain during the Roman era or as a romantic or poetic name for Scotland as a whole.

The name has been widely used by organisations and commercial entities. Notable examples include Glasgow Caledonian University, ferry operator Caledonian MacBrayne, and the now-defunct British Caledonian airline and Caledonian Railway. The Caledonian Sleeper is an overnight train service from London to Scottish destinations.

The Inverness Caledonian Thistle F.C. is a professional football club. In music, "Caledonia" is a popular Scottish patriotic song and folk ballad written by Dougie MacLean in 1977 and published in 1979 on an album of the same name; it has since been covered by various other artists, most notably Frankie Miller and Van Morrison. An original rock piece titled Caledonia appeared on Robin Trower's fourth album, "Long Misty Days", where coincidentally Frankie Miller cowrote another track on that album. The web series Caledonia and associated novel is a supernatural police drama that takes place in Glasgow, Scotland.

Ptolemy's account also referred to the Caledonia Silva, an idea still recalled in the modern expression "Caledonian Forest", although the woods are much reduced in size since Roman times.

Some scholars point out that the name "Scotland" is ultimately derived from Scotia, a Latin term first used for Ireland (also called Hibernia by the Romans) and later for Scotland, the Scoti peoples having originated in Ireland and resettled in Scotland. Another, post-conquest, Roman name for the island of Great Britain was Albion, which is cognate with the Scottish Gaelic name for Scotland: Alba.

There is an emerging trend to use the term Caledonia to describe New Caledonia in English, which reflects the usage in French of Calédonie (where the full name is La Nouvelle-Calédonie). The New Caledonian trade and investment department promotes inward investment with the slogan “Choose Caledonia”.

See also 
Battle of Mons Graupius
Caledonian Ocean
Caledonia Waterfalls
Long Misty Days

Notes

References

Bibliography

External links 

Anglia Scotia et Hibernia – 1628 map of the region by Mercator and Hondius
Clans of Caledonia – Strategy board game based in historic Scotland

Terminology of the British Isles
Scotland in the Roman era
Scottish culture